Calcarichelys ('spur turtle' or 'thorn turtle') is an extinct genus of protostegid turtle from the Late Cretaceous of the Selma Formation in Alabama, and possibly from Angola. It contains only one species, C. gemma.

Discovery 
The holotype specimen of Calcarichelys is known from Mooreville Chalk, Alabama. More complete specimens are later described from same formation. Another specimen that possibly belongs to Calcarichelys or related species is known from the Maastrichtian of Bentiaba, Angola.

Description 
It is probably closely related to Chelosphargis, as they share some characteristics. Unlike Chelosphargis, Calcarichelys is characterized by thorn-like neural plates.

References 

Late Cretaceous turtles
Protostegidae
Prehistoric turtle genera